Aterica galene, the forest glade nymph, is a butterfly of the family Nymphalidae. It is found in Africa.

The wingspan is 45–55 mm.

The larvae feed on Combretum, Quisqualis indica, Quisqualis littorea, Terminalia glaucescens and Scottellia

Subspecies
Aterica galene galene (western Kenya, Uganda, western Tanzania to Zaire, Angola, Cameroon, Senegal)
Aterica galene theophane Hopffer, 1855 (Kenya to Mozambique, Rhodesia, Malawi)
Aterica galene incisa Rothschild & Jordan, 1903 (Ethiopia)
Aterica galene extensa Heron, 1909 (Cameroon, Gabon, Congo, Angola, Democratic Republic of the Congo, Uganda, western Kenya, western Tanzania, Zambia)

References

External links
Species info 

Butterflies described in 1776
Limenitidinae
Taxa named by Peter Brown (naturalist)